The following is a list of South Korea national football team managers, first established in June 1948 with the appointment of Park Chung-hwi.

Manager history

A total of 47 managers managed South Korea during 73 appointments (excluding caretaker managers).

South Korean managers initially managed the national team as a sideline, but in 1992 the Korea Football Association adopted a policy that only full-time managers could manage the national team.

Adjunct managers (1948–1991)

Full-time managers (1992–present)

Manager records

 Most matches managed 78, Huh Jung-moo
 Most matches managed (unofficial) 126, Kim Jung-nam
 Most matches won 54, Ham Heung-chul
 Most matches won in an appointment 35, Paulo Bento
 Longest career in an appointment , Paulo Bento, from 22 August 2018 to 6 December 2022
 Most appointments 5, Kim Yong-sik, Min Byung-dae and Park Jong-hwan

Notes

References

Korea